The will and testament of clerics is a controversial issue for a number of Christian denominations.

Many churches have rules on the way in which property that is owned by a cleric can be distributed on death.  These rules can change according to what stage the property was gained (before or after ordination), what the office that was held and whether the priest was in a religious institute.

References

Roman Catholic clergy